Turris aenigmaticus is an extinct species of sea snail, a marine gastropod mollusk in the family Turridae, the turrids.

Distribution
This extinct marine species was found in Cretaceous strata in Cameroun

References

aenigmaticus
Gastropods described in 1956